The toad mouse (Mus bufo) is a species of rodent in the family Muridae.
It is found in Burundi, Democratic Republic of the Congo, Rwanda, and Uganda.
Its natural habitats are subtropical or tropical moist montane forests and arable land.

References

Mus (rodent)
Mammals described in 1906
Taxa named by Oldfield Thomas
Taxonomy articles created by Polbot